Cumberland Boroughs was an electoral district of the Legislative Assembly in the Australian state of New South Wales from 1856 to 1859, consisting of the Cumberland County towns of Richmond, Windsor, Liverpool and Campbelltown, but not the surrounding rural areas, which were in Cumberland (South Riding) and Cumberland (North Riding). The district was abolished in 1859, with Richmond and Windsor forming the new electorate of Windsor, Campbelltown was included in Narellan and Liverpool became part of Central Cumberland.

Members for Cumberland Boroughs

Election results

References

Former electoral districts of New South Wales
1856 establishments in Australia
Constituencies established in 1856
1859 disestablishments in Australia
Constituencies disestablished in 1859